Harpalus alpivagus is a species of ground beetle in the subfamily Harpalinae. It was described by Tschitscherine in 1899.

References

alpivagus
Beetles described in 1899